Heterophotus ophistoma, the Wingfin snaggletooth, is a species of barbeled dragonfish found in oceans worldwide at depths of .  This species grows to a length of  SL.  This species is the only known species in its genus.

References
 

Stomiidae
Taxa named by Charles Tate Regan
Taxa named by Ethelwynn Trewavas
Fish described in 1929